Dimitri Colupaev (born 29 January 1990) is a Moldovan-born German swimmer. He competed in the 4×200 metre freestyle relay event at the 2012 Summer Olympics and finished fourth. At the 2012 European Aquatics Championships, Colupaev and his German teammates won the gold in the 4×200 metre freestyle relay.

In 2010 he was studying at the University of Southern California in the United States.

References

External links 

 
 
 
 

1990 births
Living people
Olympic swimmers of Germany
Swimmers at the 2012 Summer Olympics
German male freestyle swimmers
Moldovan emigrants to Germany
Place of birth missing (living people)
Medalists at the FINA World Swimming Championships (25 m)
European Aquatics Championships medalists in swimming